Pattukkottai Kalyanasundaram (13 April 1930 – 8 October 1959) also known as Pattukottaiyar was an Indian Tamil poet and lyricist. Considered to be the most popular Tamil lyricist of the 1950s, he is particularly remembered for the philosophy-tinged lyrics he penned for M. G. Ramachandran’s movies.

Early life 
He was born on 13 April 1930 in an agricultural family at Sengapaduthankadu in Thamarankottai village, a village near the town of Pattukkottai. His parents were Arunachalam Pillai and Visalakshi Ammal. Arunachalam Pillai was a Tamil scholar and a folk poet. PKS had an elder brother, Ganapathisundaram, and a sister, Vedhanayaki. PKS never went to school, but had an in-born talent for poetry.

Career 
PKS worked for Kuyil, a magazine run by Bharathidasan. His first opportunity to write lyrics for a Tamil movie was for Paditha Penn. However, he achieved success as lyricist even before the release of Paditha Penn (which was released on 20 April 1956) when Maheswari, a film for which he penned five song lyrics, was released ahead on 13 November 1955. The music director for this movie was G. Ramanathan; C. V. Sridhar wrote the script and dialogue. The Kalyanasundaram–Sridhar combination proved to be successful again with the movie Kalyana Parisu. As detailed by director Sridhar's remembrance PKS wrote eight lyrics for this love triangle plot, all of which were successful.

PKS was very active and successful in the Tamil film industry during the years 1954–1959 and wrote around 250 songs during this period, including several songs for two leading Tamil movie stars of that period – MGR and Sivaji Ganesan. List of movies, which feature PKS lyrics for the two actors:

MGR: 7 movies; Chakravarthi Thirumagal (1957), Mahadhevi (1957), Nadodi Mannan (1958), Arasilangkumari (1961), Thirudadhe (1961), Vikramaadhithan (1962) and Kalai Arasi (1963).

Sivaji Ganesan: 11 movies; Rangoon Radha (1956), Ambikapathi (1957), Pudhaiyal (1957), Makkalai Petra Magarasi (1957), Uthama Puthiran (1958), Padhi Bhakti (1958), Aval Yar ? (1959), Bhaaga Pirivinai (1959), Thanga Padhumai (1959), Irumbu Thirai (1960), Punar Jenmam (1961).

Later life 
He married Gowravammal from Athikkottai (a village near Pattukkottai). His mentor Bharathidasan presided over the nuptials on 11 September 1957 at Madras. In 1959, the couple gave birth to their only child, whom they named Kumaravelu. After suffering severe migraine attacks, Kalyanasundaram underwent operation to his nose in September 1959. It is rather unfortunate that he was a victim of a botched surgery, and a few days later, he died of cerebral haemorrhage on 8 October 1959, at a young age of 29.

List of films for which PKS wrote lyrics 

Maheswari (1955)
Paditha Penn (1956)
Marma Veeran (1956)
Kula Dheivam (1956)
Paasavalai (1956)
Rangoon Radha (1956)
Chakravarthi Thirumagal (1957)
Makkalai Petra Magarasi (1957)
Allavudeenum Arputha Vilakkum (1957)
Karpukkarasi (1957)
Sowbagyawathi (1957)
Aaravalli (1957)
Ambikapathy (1957)
Mahadhevi (1957)
Pudhaiyal (1957)
Kanniyin Sabatham (1958)
Uthama Puthiran (1958)
Pillai Kaniyamudhu (1958)
Petra Maganai Vitra Annai (1958)
Thedi Vandha Selvam (1958)
Thirumanam (1958)
Nadodi Mannan (1958)
Naan Valartha Thangai (1958)
Anbu Engey (1958)
Pathi Bakthi (1958)
Thanga Padhumai (1959)
Pandithevan (1959)
Nalla Theerpu (1959)
Kalyana Parisu (1959)
Kalyanikku Kalyanam (1959)
Pudhumai Penn (1959)
Vaazha Vaitha Deivam (1959)
Ulagam Sirikirathu (1959)
Aval Yaar (1959)
Bhaaga Pirivinai (1959)
Kan Thiranthathu (1959)
Amudhavalli (1959)
Thalai Koduthaan Thambi (1959)
Ponn Vilaiyum Boomi (1959)
Kalaivaanan (1959)
Irumbu Thirai (1960)
Rathinapuri Ilavarasi (1960)
Mahalakshmi (1960)
Sangili Devan (1960)
Ellorum Innaattu Mannar (1960)
Ondrupattal Undu Vazhvu (1960)
Aalukkoru Veedu (1960)
Paadhai Theriyudhu Paar (1960)
Veerakkanal (1960)
Arasilangkumari (1961)
Punar Jenmam (1961)
Thirudadhe (1961)
Kumara Raja (1961)
Vikramaadhithan (1962)
Ethaiyum Thangum Ithaiyam (1962)
Kalai Arasi (1963)
Maganey Kel (1965)

Legacy 
The first compilation of Pattukkottai Kalyanasundaram's songs appeared in 1965 in print form. Comparative studies and criticism have also been published in the form of books by several authors, like Paa. Udayakumar, Ki. Sembiyan, Solomon Pappaiah, Irakuladasan, M. P. Manivel, Pandian, Paa. Veeramani and others.

Tamil Nadu Murpokku Ezhuthalar Sangam, Pattukkottai, brought out souvenirs on Pattukkottaiyaar's 50th, 56th and 60th birthdays. A bronze statue was unveiled at a busy junction in Pattukkottai town and a special souvenir was released on the statue unveiling ceremony in 1995..

Government Of India brought out a souvenir on the occasion of the Silver Jubilee of India's Independence recognising Mahakavi Subramaniya Bharathi, Pavendhar Bharathidasan and Makkal Kavignar Pattukkottai Kalyanasundaram as the three foremost poets of the 20th century in Tamil.

In 1981, the Chief Minister of the state, M. G. Ramachandran conferred posthumously the prestigious Bharathidasan Award to Pattukkottaiyaar. Later in 1993,the then Chief Minister Jayalalithaa Jayaram declared nationalization of Pattukkottaiyaar's literary works.In 2000,a memorial structure, Pattukkottai Kalyanasundaram Manimandapam, was erected in Pattukkottai and was inaugurated by the then Chief Minister Muthuvel Karunanidhi.

References 

1930 births
1959 deaths
Tamil film poets
20th-century composers
20th-century Indian musicians